Apiro is a comune (municipality) in the Province of Macerata in the Italian region Marche, located about  southwest of Ancona and about  northwest of Macerata.

Religion

Churches

 The church of Sant'Urbano has been converted into a museum of religious artifacts and paintings.
 San Francesco delle Favete, a 14th-century church is located a few kilometers outside of the old town of Apiro.

References

External links
 Official website

Cities and towns in the Marche